The so called Titchfield Canal was used to drain marshland in the lower Meon valley and is a two-mile watercourse between the village of Titchfield, Hampshire, and the coast at Titchfield Haven adjacent to the modern  nature reserve. Lying above and roughly parallel to the nearby River Meon it is plainly artificial, but its origins and purpose have been warmly debated.  

It should not be confused with the "New River", a leat from the north eastern corner of Wickham along the western side of the Meon valley, being supplied by various springs before almost joining the river north of Fontley mill. It reappears and its course has been restored near Bridge Lane, Originally, it followed a hillside course to the millpond supplying Titchfied Hammer. Originally designed to irrigate the water meadows in Funtley, it was taken over by the occupants of the forge which resulted in litigation between the forge operators and local farmers.

That the "canal" has been used as a feeder channel for a water meadow system is beyond question. The telltale surface patterns of water meadows can still be made out in places from the path along the Canal, and are even clearer from Google Earth images. Further, the remains of a couple of the sluices through which water was admitted from the Canal to the water meadows can still be seen, and 19th century 1:2500 maps show a dozen more but it was never used as a channel for ships to dock at Titchfield for which there is no evidence whatsoever. A very few ships landed goods at Titchfield Haven.
On 24 June 1611 the parish register notes that "the same day Titchfield Haven was shutt out by one Richard Talbotts industrie under gods permisione at the costs of the right honourable the Earle of Southampton". It has been inferred from this that a dike was built across the Meon Estuary, preventing sailing vessels from entering the river and cutting off Titchfield from seaborne trade. There is certainly a dike across the Estuary now, but what in detail was done in 1611 is not known. It has been further inferred that to get around this inferred problem a substitute navigation channel in the form of the New River was built at the same time. No contemporaneous archival evidence has yet come to light to support this hypothesis; what little documentation there is suggests a land reclamation project, for which a total closure of the estuary would not necessarily be required.

There is evidence of further large works being carried out in the Meon Estuary in the 1670s. In a Chancery case  starting in 1739 elderly residents testified that boats still sailed up to Titchfield in their lifetimes and only ceased to do so when the heirs of the Earl built a barrier across the river. Although they are imprecise as to date their evidence does bracket the 1670s for the final closure. Also, presentments in the Titchfield Manorial Court in 1676 report that the Lord of the Manor by cutting the New River "hath taken away and doth detain" parts of the copyholds of two tenants, John Cooper and John Landy, implying that at that time the construction of the New River was recent.

What archival evidence has so far come to light, together with the visible evidence on the ground, tends towards the agricultural explanation rather than the navigational one, but a final answer depends on the discovery of further evidence. In the meantime the book referenced below contains a number of papers by different writers discussing the various theories, and numerous source references.

See also
Canals of Great Britain
History of the British canal system

References

External links
Fareham Borough Council, Walk Ten: Titchfield Canal
Hampshire County Council, Painting of Titchfield Haven, at Westbury Manor Museum, Fareham

Canals in Hampshire
Transport in Hampshire
Titchfield